Leave Your Light On is the name of Aloud's debut full-length album, which was released on May 2, 2006 on Lemon Merchant Records. The majority was recorded from May through August 2005 in Dayville, Connecticut, with the rest being completed in Brighton, Massachusetts. It was produced by Hugh Wyman (ex-guitarist of Baby Strange and The Luxury).

The album was released to college radio stations (and some commercial stations)  the second week of May. National radioplay for the album peaked on the RIYL Music chart in July at #191 (out of 875).

Leave Your Light On also received many favorable reviews upon its release, most notably in the Northeast United States and online music blogs.

In April, a music video was released for the song "Beaches", the album's leadoff single. Another video for "Can You Hear Me Now?" was released in early March 2007.

Track listing

Personnel
Aloud
Jen de la Osa: lead vocals, guitar, organ
Henry Beguiristain: lead vocals, guitar, piano
Roy Fontaine: bass, backing vocals
Ross Lohr: drums, percussion

Additional personnel
Hugh Wyman: producer
Tom Polce: mixing, mastering
Wendy Mittelstadt: viola on "Slipped In Your Dream"
Chris Phillips - engineering (Dayville, CT)
Scott Brown: engineering (Dayville, CT)

Additional engineering by Hugh Wyman and Aloud.

External links
Can You Hear Me Now? - Music Video (YouTube)
Beaches - Music Video (YouTube)

Notes

2006 debut albums
Aloud albums